Crocellina is a monotypic fungal genus in the family Roccellaceae. It contains the single species Crocellina cinerea, a saxicolous (rock-dwelling), crustose lichen that is endemic to Socotra Island in the Indian Ocean. This species was first described in 1882 by Swiss botanist Johannes Müller Argoviensis as Dirina cinerea, and later transferred to genus Roccellina in 1983. Crocellina was circumscribed in 2014 by Anders Tehler and Damien Ernst, following molecular phylogenetic analysis and revision of the Roccellaceae.

References

Roccellaceae
Lichen genera
Taxa described in 2014
Arthoniomycetes genera